Happiness is a 1917 comedy drama feature film written by C. Gardner Sullivan and starring Enid Bennett and Charles Gunn.  A rich orphan and heiress played by Bennett is described in the newspapers as "the richest and most snobbish girl in America." She goes to a co-ed college where she is snubbed by students who view her as a snob.  A romance develops with a poor student (played by Charles Gunn) who is taking in washing to pay his way through college. A print exists in the Library of Congress collection.

Cast
Enid Bennett - Doris Wingate
Charles Gunn - Robert Lee Hollister
Thelma Salter - Dolly Temple
Andrew Arbuckle - Nicodemus
Gertrude Claire - Miss Pratt
Adele Belgrade - Priscilla Wingate
John Gilbert - Richard Forrester
Leo Willis - uncredited

References

External links 

1917 films
American black-and-white films
American silent feature films
1910s English-language films
Films about orphans
1917 comedy-drama films
Films directed by Reginald Barker
1910s American films
Silent American comedy-drama films